= Elbrus Together =

Ukrainian TV film

- Starring: Slava Mykhailov; Nadya Mykhailova; Alex Rachenko; Raisa Rachenko; Vladimir Rachenko
- Cinematography: Dima Rachenko
- Edited by: Liza Rachenko
- Production company: LiDiNa Production
- Release date: August 19, 2019
- Running time: 53 minutes
- Country: Ukraine
- Languages: Russian; English; Ukrainian

Elbrus Together is a 2019 documentary adventure film directed and produced by Liza Rachenko. It stars an ensemble cast of Slava Mykhailov, Nadya Mykhailova, Alex Rachenko, Raisa Rachenko, Vladimir Rachenko. It is based on the real-life effort of the 9-person Rachenko family, and focuses on their preparation to climb the highest peak in Europe, Mount Elbrus.

The film was released theatrically on August 19, 2019. It was first released in IMAX on August 19, 2019 as a limited release in Ukraine. In September 2019, the film became available for streaming on YouTube in the United States and Canada, along with 36 other countries.

== Plot ==
A family of nine people, all of different ages, prepares to climb the highest point in Europe - Mount Elbrus. The documentary explores their struggles and achievements as they learn to become better mountaineers and grow closer as a family.

== Cast ==
- Slava Mykhailov as himself
- Nadya Mykhailova as herself
- Alex Rachenko as himself
- Raisa Rachenko as herself
- Vladimir Rachenko as himself
